Peace Harbor Hospital is a 21-bed acute care facility and a Level IV Trauma Center.  It is located in Florence, Oregon, and serves western Lane County.

See also
List of hospitals in Oregon
Peace Harbor Hospital Heliport

References
 PeaceHealth in Florence, Oregon

Hospital buildings completed in 1989
Hospitals in Oregon
1989 establishments in Oregon
Hospitals established in 1989